Rifai Raatheeb is a ritual performed by a section of Ahmed ar-Rifa'i. Rifai is a name that originates from Sufi saint Ahmed-Al-Kabeer who was born in the Wasit region in Baghdad, Iraq in 1118. Shaikh Rifai committed himself to memorise the Quran at age seven.

Ritual 
He founded the Rifai Sufi Order. Rifai Ratheeb, which is performed at ritual festivals and homes. The ritual is performed to defeat incurable diseases and to fulfill the aspirations of the faithful. It is the pilgrimage of Shaykh Ahmad Rifai. However, no authentic source confirms this origin.

The ritual involves piercing the body without pain, immunity to snake and fire and riding of wild animals. Piercing affects the tongue, the ear and the stomach. Knives and steel tools are used.

Hymns known as Byths or Ratheebs are sung. (More than twenty such byths are used)

The followers of the ritual believe that even though injuries are inflicted on the bodies of the performers by weapons, these do not cause pain or damage the body. They believe that since the ritual is performed by devotees who have received ijazath (permission) from their sheikh, it will not cause injuries.

While followers of the ritual portray  Rifai Ratib  as folk art, revivalist as well as reformist movements in maintain that this ritual is effective

References 

Rituals
Mappilas